is a passenger railway station in the town of Yorii, Saitama, Japan, operated by East Japan Railway Company (JR East).

Lines

Station layout
The station is unstaffed and consists of one side platform serving a single bidirectional track. The station is unattended.

History

The station opened on 25 January 1933.

The station became Suica-compatible from February 2002. A new station building was completed in October 2012.

Passenger statistics
In fiscal 2010, the station was used by an average of 89 passengers daily (boarding passengers only).

Surrounding area
Yorii Yodo Post Office
Yodo Elementary School

See also
 List of railway stations in Japan

References

External links

 Yōdo Station information (JR East) 
 Yōdo Station information (Saitama Prefectural Government) 

Railway stations in Japan opened in 1933
Stations of East Japan Railway Company
Railway stations in Saitama Prefecture
Hachikō Line
Yorii, Saitama